The MetroWest Regional Transit Authority (MWRTA) is a regional public transit authority in the state of Massachusetts providing bus and paratransit service to sixteen communities in the Boston MetroWest. The MWRTA was formed in 2006 and began service on July 1, 2007 with the purpose of filling a void in public transportation service in the MetroWest. Through a commitment to deliver expanded public transportation service to the business and commercial hubs across the MetroWest region, the goals and purpose of the MWRTA are embodied in its mission statement: "Build a public transportation system to deliver convenient and dependable service that enhances mobility, environmental quality and economic vitality in the region." Funding for the MWRTA comes partially from the state and local governments of the communities it operates within.

Paratransit 
Paratransit service is a flexible passenger transportation service which does not follow fixed routes or schedules. According to ADA requirements, the MWRTA must provide paratransit service as a curb-to-curb service to eligible residents having a physical, cognitive, or mental disability within a 3/4 mile radius of a fixed route regular bus service. In addition, MWRTA paratransit service is also provided to eligible residents within any of its sixteen member communities. All MWRTA buses are equipped with lift systems to accommodate the physically handicapped along their regular fixed routes. The MWRTA also provides paratransit service to MWRTA service area border towns at an increased fare. The paratransit service is provided in the form of a call-ahead multi-passenger shuttle allowing disabled residents of MWRTA communities to be picked up at their houses and shuttled to any other location within or bordering the MWRTA service region, such as other residences, grocery stores, hospitals, or job sites.

Prior to the creation of the MWRTA, the Massachusetts Bay Transportation Authority (MBTA) provided part of its paratransit service, called The RIDE (see MBTA accessibility) to the two communities of Framingham and Natick within the current MWRTA service area. The MBTA continue to provide The RIDE to Framingham and Natick until 2009 under contractual obligations. On July 1, 2009, administration of paratransit service to Framingham and Natick switched from the MBTA to MWRTA in alignment with the change in assessments paid to the MWRTA by those communities rather than to the MBTA.

Buses 
The MWRTA provides sixteen fixed bus routes. The fleet consists of Ford E-Series cutaway-based 16-passenger buses. All buses contain lift systems capable of carrying up to 1,000 pounds for physically disabled passengers.

Routes 
Displayed below is the MWRTA route listing. Following each route entry is a listing of points of interest which can be reached along the route..

The MWRTA partnership with GeoGraphics Lab provides live-updates of bus locations via an online map service. The service displays current bus locations on a map with the use of bus-mounted GPS devices. The map service also allows the individual bus routes to be displayed overlaying the map.

MicroTransit 
In 2021 MWRTA launched a new MicroTransit service called Catch Connect, in coordination with MWRTA's mobile app, Catch. Catch Connect was launched in the Town of Wellesley in February 2021, alongside the existing Fixed Route 8. In March the Route 8 was removed from service and replaced entirely with Catch Connect.  The MicroTransit service parameters include the entire Town of Wellesley, as well as the Woodland and Waban MBTA Green Line Stations, Newton-Wellesley Hospital, and Natick Community Center.  The MBTA Stations and Natick COA served as connecting points to the MBTA, and to MWRTA's Fixed Routes 10 and 11. 

In July 2021 using MassDOT Discretionary Funding, MWRTA launched Catch Connect service in Framingham and Natick on Saturday's and Sunday's, from 8 AM - 6PM.  The service area includes Downtown Framingham, Downtown Natick, and the Route 9 Golden Triangle retail area.  

In June 2022 with funded by ARPA Grants and aided by Representative Kate Hogan, MWRTA launched Catch Connect service in Hudson, MA on Saturday's from 8 AM - 6PM.  MWRTA's Route 15 began service in Hudson in 2016 and had increased continuously in ridership over the years.  The new CC service provides Hudson and Marlborough residents flexible Saturday service.  The service area includes the entire Town of Hudson, and a small portion of Downtown Marlborough to connect riders to the existing Routes 7 and 7C Saturday. 

Riders of the Catch Connect service are able to book their trips directly through the MWRTA Catch App. If riders do not have access to a smartphone they can call the MWRTA Central Reservations department to have a representative book the trip for them. The Catch Connect service is a shared-ride service open to the public, and uses fully accessible Ford Transit Vans and Ford cutaway 12 passenger vehicles.

Framingham Intermodal 
In 2017 MWRTA began a partnership with the MBTA and entered into a lease agreement for the Framingham Commuter Rail Station.  MWRTA hired a full time Operations Manager and part time Security Officer for the station, added a caboose purchased from Edaville Railroad for office space, and created bus shelters for MWRTA buses to stop.  Over the course of a few years MWRTA increased parking at the Station by 150+ spaces, added lighting and security cameras, replaced both staircases location on the platform that were in a state of disrepair, added signage and information, updated and maintained the elevators which were also in a state of disrepair, and increased security presence, creating a safer area for riders, commuters, and pedestrians. MWRTA also build a partnership with Greyhound to allow Greyhound buses going to and from New York to make a stop at the Intermodal Station (also known as the "Banana Lot"). MWRTA also added bike lockers to the station, allowing commuters to park their bike in a safe, clean, and dry space when they board the train for a small monthly fee. 

MWRTA renewed the lease agreement with the MBTA in 2022 and continues to maintain the Commuter Rail Station; providing daily cleaning and oversight, snow removal in the winter, additional trash receptacles, access to multiple modes of transportation and 9 MWRTA bus routes, as well as Catch Connect service on the weekends.

History

The birth of the MWRTA 
In 2006, an Economic Stimulus Bill passed in the Commonwealth of Massachusetts included legislation pushed by Karen Spilka and other MetroWest area legislators. The legislation opened the possibility of a new Regional Transit Authority to be formed in the MetroWest region. The legislation states that any community providing an annual assessment to the Massachusetts Bay Transportation Authority (MBTA) but not served directly by the MBTA may form their own Regional Transit Authority (RTA) using that funding instead.

Under the advisement of the legislation, the MWRTA was created in Framingham with the neighboring communities of Holliston, Hopkinton, Natick, Ashland, and Wayland. At the time, Framingham had its own community bus system called The LIFT (Local Inter Framingham Transit).The newly formed MWRTA was based on The LIFT. With this system, the communities of the MWRTA would have a basis for their new RTA.

Natick neighborhood bus system 
As part of the growth of the MWRTA and due to Natick joining the system, Natick's own Neighborhood Bus system was incorporated into the MWRTA in the summer of 2008. Rates rose from $1 to $1.50 for adults with the rate hike justified as allowing residents of Natick to move anywhere in the system, as far out as Marlborough. The incorporation of this system created a link of service from Natick to Marlborough across two routes spanning more than 25 miles combined.

The RIDE 
The RIDE is a paratransit service provided by the Massachusetts Bay Transportation Authority (MBTA) to regions of the Greater Boston Area. Prior to the creation of the MWRTA, the MBTA provided paratransit service to the MWRTA member communities of Framingham and Natick through The RIDE. Due to the formation of the MWRTA as a new Regional Transit Authority (RTA) within the MetroWest, annual assessments can now be funneled toward the MWRTA rather than the MBTA. Administration of paratransit service to Framingham and Natick switched from the MBTA to the MWRTA on July 1, 2009.

MBTA Green Line shuttle 

Green Line shuttle service is targeted at commuters traveling to work in the Metrowest from Boston. It poses an alternative to the MBTA Commuter Rail Framingham/Worcester Line which focuses more on Boston inbound traffic during the morning hours, and outbound traffic from Boston to Framingham during the evening hours. Consequently, the commuter rail provides less frequent service in the opposite direction during those respective times. The Green Line shuttle instead links the MWRTA bus system with the MBTA subway system and provides service every twenty-five minutes during morning and evening commute hours.

Future plans 

The MWRTA is discussing expansion of bus service within its service region particularly to the four communities which receive only paratransit service. In particular, Sherborn is a member community of the MWRTA, but does not receive fixed route bus service. Prior to the creation of the MWRTA, Sherborn paid annual assessments to the MBTA although it did not receive public transportation service. Since joining the MWRTA, selectmen conducted surveys through mass mailings to the residents of Sherborn, and responses were mostly positive toward creating a bus route between downtown Sherborn and a Natick commuter-rail station.

References

External links 

 MetroWest Regional Transit Authority Website
 GeoGraphics Lab MetroWest
 YouTube - MWRTA new buses
 The RIDE

Framingham, Massachusetts
Bus transportation in Massachusetts
Organizations established in 2006
Public transportation in the Boston area
Transit authorities with natural gas buses
Paratransit services in the United States